Larry Butler is a former Irish Fianna Fáil politician, who was a member of Seanad Éireann on the Industrial and Commercial Panel from 2007 to 2011. He was elected to Dublin County Council in 1991 for the Glencullen area, and was re-elected in 1999 to Dún Laoghaire–Rathdown County Council for the Ballybrack electoral area.

Following an expenses controversy, he resigned the Fianna Fáil party whip on 5 June 2010. He did not contest the 2011 Seanad election.

References

Year of birth missing (living people)
Living people
Councillors of Dublin County Council
Fianna Fáil senators
Local councillors in Dún Laoghaire–Rathdown
Members of the 23rd Seanad